The Ministry of Transportation, formerly Department of Transportation is a government ministry responsible for the governance and regulation of transportation in Indonesia.  The Ministry is located in Jakarta.

Task and function
The primary task of the Ministry of Transportation is to execute transportation affairs in Indonesia, its function are as follows:
 develop, establishment and execution of transportation policy
 asset management within ministry of transportation responsibility
 supervision of execution of transportation policy
 provider of technical support and supervision with regional level
 executor of national level technical assistance

Organizational structure
 Office of the Deputy Minister of Transportation
 Secretariat General of Transportation
 Directorate General of Land Transportation
 Directorate General of Sea Transportation
 Secretariate of Directorate General
 Directorate of Sea Traffic
 Directorate of Seaport Affairs
 Directorate of Ship and Sailor
 Directorate of Maritime Navigation
 Directorate of Sea and Coast Guard
 Technical Executive Unit (Unit Pelaksana Teknis), such as Sea and Coast Guard Base 
 Directorate General of Civil Aviation
 Directorate General of Rail Transportation
 Inspectorate General of Transportation
 Transportation Research and Development Agency
 Transportation Human Resource Development Agency
 Jabodetabek Transportation Management Agency 
 Special Advisor to the Minister on Transportation Environment
 Special Advisor to the Minister on Transportation Technology
 Special Advisor to the Minister on Transportation Regulations and Safety
 Special Advisor to the Minister on Modes and Systems of transportion
 Special Advisor to the Minister on Transportation Economics and Partnership

List of ministers
Abikoesno Tjokrosoejoso (19 August – 14 November 1945, 30 July – 14 September 1953)
Abdulkarim (14 November 1945 – 2 October 1946)
Djuanda Kartawidjaja (2 October 1946 – 4 August 1949, 6 September 1950 – 30 July 1953)
Indratjahja (19 December 1948 – 13 July 1949; de facto in the Emergency Government)
Herling Laoh (4 August 1949 – 6 September 1950; from 20 December 1949 served for the RIS)Mananti Sitompul (21 January 1950 – 6 September 1950; served for the Republic of Indonesia, a state within the RIS)
Roosseno Soerjohadikoesomo (29 September 1953 – 23 October 1954)Ali Sastroamidjojo (23 October – 19 November 1954; acting)
Adnan Kapau Gani (19 November 1954 – 24 July 1955)
 (12 August 1955 – 3 March 1956)
Suchjar Tedjasukmana (24 March 1956 – 14 March 1957)
Sukardan (April 1957 – July 1959)
Mohammad Nazir (April 1957 – July 1959)
Djatikoesoemo (July 1959 – April 1963)
Abdoelmoettalip Danoeningrat (July 1959 – November 1963)
R. Iskandar (July 1959 – August 1964) 
Hidajat Martaatmadja (April 1963 – March 1966)
Ali Sadikin (November 1963 – March 1966)
Partono (August 1964 – July 1966)
Soerjadi Soerjadarma (February 1966 – March 1966)
Jatidjan (March 1966 – July 1966) 
Utojo Utomo (March 1966 – July 1966) 
Susatyo Mardi (March 1966 – July 1966) 
S. H. Simatupang (March 1966 – July 1966)
Sutopo (July 1966 – October 1967)
Salimin Prawiro Sumarto (October 1967 – June 1968)
Frans Seda (June 1968 – March 1973)
Emil Salim (March 1973 – March 1978)
Roesmin Noerjadin (March 1978 – March 1988)
Azwar Anas (March 1988 – March 1993)
Haryanto Dhanutirto (March 1993 – March 1998)
Giri Suseno Hadihardjono (March 1998 – October 1999)
Agum Gumelar (29 October 1999 – 1 June 2001, 10 August 2001 – 24 May 2004) (24 May – 20 October 2004; acting)
 (1 June 2001 – 23 July 2001)
Hatta Rajasa (21 October 2004 – 9 May 2007)
Jusman Syafii Djamal (9 May 2007 – 20 October 2009)
Freddy Numberi (22 October 2009 – 19 October 2011)
 (19 October 2011 – 1 October 2014)Bambang Susantono (1–20 October 2014; acting)
Ignasius Jonan (27 October 2014 – 27 July 2016)
Budi Karya Sumadi (27 July 2016 – 20 October 2019, 23 October 2019 – present)

See also

Government of Indonesia
Transport in Indonesia
Angkasa Pura

References

External links
  Ministry of Transportation official site

Transportation
Transport organizations based in Indonesia
Indonesia